Juan Garat and Roberto Saad were the defending champions, but Garat did not compete this year. Saad teamed up with Patricio Arnold and lost in the quarterfinals to David Adams and Andrei Olhovskiy.

Adams and Olhovskiy won the title by defeating Sergio Casal and Emilio Sánchez 6–7, 6–3, 7–5 in the final.

Seeds
All seeds received a bye to the second round.

Draw

Finals

Top half

Bottom half

References

External links
 Official results archive (ATP)
 Official results archive (ITF)

Doubles
Austrian Open Kitzbühel